Luther Green (November 13, 1946 – January 25, 2006) was an American basketball player.

Born in New York City, Green played college basketball at Long Island University and was selected by the Cincinnati Royals in the third round of the 1969 NBA draft and by the Miami Floridians in the 1969 ABA Draft.

Green played for the New York Nets of the American Basketball Association for two seasons. From 1971 to 1972 he played for the Harlem Wizards, and he played briefly for the National Basketball Association's Philadelphia 76ers during the 1972–73 NBA season.

Green died of lung cancer at the age of 59.

References

External links
Career stats at basketball-reference.com

1946 births
2006 deaths
African-American basketball players
American men's basketball players
Basketball players from New York City
Cincinnati Royals draft picks
Deaths from lung cancer
DeWitt Clinton High School alumni
Hartford Capitols players
LIU Brooklyn Blackbirds men's basketball players
Miami Floridians draft picks
New York Nets players
Philadelphia 76ers players
Small forwards
Wilkes-Barre Barons players
20th-century African-American sportspeople
21st-century African-American people